John Raphael Peacey (16 July 1896 – 31 October 1971) was an English cricketer.  Peacey's batting style is unknown.  He was born at Hove, Sussex and educated at St Edmund's School, Canterbury. He was also a Canon in the Church of England and wrote some 18 hymn texts which were published posthumously in 1991 under the title 'Go Forth For God' which was released by the Hope Publishing Company.

Peacey made his first-class debut for Sussex against Cambridge University in 1920.  He made two further appearances in 1921 against Warwickshire and Oxford University, before making a single appearance in 1922 against Cambridge University.  In these four matches, he scored a total of 54 runs at an average of 9.00, with a high score of 26.

He died at Hurstpierpoint, Sussex on 31 October 1971.

References

External links

J. R Peacy at Hope Publishing

1896 births
1971 deaths
People from Hove
People educated at St Edmund's School Canterbury
English cricketers
Sussex cricketers